Les Bubb is a British mime artist.

Career

Les Bubb who was born in Sticklepath, Barnstaple (March 16, 1961)  He started his miming career in 1982, performing in pubs and cabaret clubs.

In 1988, he appeared on Jim Davidson Introduces: New Entertainers, Friday Night Live twice, and on the BBC kids' shows Going Live! and “What's All This Then” in 1987. Les also appeared on The Famous Compere's Police Ball in 1990.

In  1996, Les was approached by the BBC to write a format for a children's television show, which later became Hububb. Les starred alongside Elaine C Smith, Miltos Yerolemou, Ben Keaton and Nicola Park, with fellow mime artist Emil Wolk.

Les then appeared in the films Invincible, Yam and three Harry Potter films as a voice artist and actor trainer.

He also appeared at Glastonbury 2000, Jim Davidson Presents, I'd Do Anything, Max Headroom, Paramount City, Talking Telephone Numbers, The Slammer and most recently Andy's Adventures. Les still performs on stage.

Les performed with pop band Take That in the role of a professor in the Take That Progress tour of 2011. Les is performed with Take That for most of summer 2011.

Les has a son called Ben Bubb.

In 2021 with Camilla Halford, Les Bubb started teaching mime online through the Les Bubb School of Mime to develop the next generation of mime artists around the world.

Filmography

References

External links
 TV.com : Biography of Les Bubb
 The British Council : Les Bubb in Ankara, Turkey
 

British mimes
Living people
Year of birth missing (living people)
Place of birth missing (living people)